Nurdin Donbaev (born 31 July 1974) is a Kyrgyzstani wrestler. He competed in the men's freestyle 54 kg at the 2000 Summer Olympics.

References
 

1974 births
Living people
Kyrgyzstani male sport wrestlers
Olympic wrestlers of Kyrgyzstan
Wrestlers at the 2000 Summer Olympics
Place of birth missing (living people)
Asian Games medalists in wrestling
Wrestlers at the 1994 Asian Games
Wrestlers at the 1998 Asian Games
Wrestlers at the 2002 Asian Games
Medalists at the 1994 Asian Games
Asian Games bronze medalists for Kyrgyzstan
20th-century Kyrgyzstani people
21st-century Kyrgyzstani people